East Ridge may refer to:
 East Ridge, Accra, Ghana
 East Ridge, Tennessee, United States

See also 
 East Ridge High School (disambiguation)